Sainte-Sabine (French for Saint Sabina) may refer to the following places:

 Sainte-Sabine, Chaudière-Appalaches, Quebec, a municipality in the Chaudière-Appalaches region of Quebec
 Sainte-Sabine, Montérégie, Quebec, a municipality in the Brome-Missisquoi Regional County Municipality, Quebec
 Sainte-Sabine, a commune in the Côte-d'Or department in eastern France
 Sainte-Sabine-Born, a commune in the Dordogne department, southwestern France
 Sainte-Sabine-sur-Longève, a commune in the Sarthe department, Pays-de-la-Loire, north-western France

See also
Sabine (disambiguation)
Sabina (disambiguation)
Santa Sabina (disambiguation)